Yu Daqing (born November 1957) is a lieutenant-general in the People's Liberation Army of China, who served as Deputy Political Commissar of the Second Artillery Corps. He was placed under investigation by the PLA's anti-graft agency in December 2014.

Life and career
Yu was born and raised in Suizhong County, Liaoning. He joined the People's Liberation Army in 1975 and the Communist Party of China in 1977. Yu served as Political Commissar of the 123 Division of the Forty-first Army from 2005 to 2006, and Deputy Head of the Cadre Department of the People's Liberation Army General Political Department between 2007 and 2009, he was promoted to the head position in December 2009. He attained the rank of major general in July 2008. He became Director of the Political Department of the Second Artillery Corps in December 2012 and Deputy Political Commissar of the Second Artillery Corps in December 2013. Yu was promoted to lieutenant-general in July 2014. On January 15, 2015, the People's Liberation Army announced that he has been under investigation since December 2014 for "seriously violating party discipline".

References

  

  

1957 births
Living people
People's Liberation Army generals from Liaoning
People from Huludao